Bedford & County Golf Club is a golf club to the northeast of Clapham, Bedfordshire, England. It was established in 1912. As of 1995 the course measured 6,290 yards.

References

External links
Official site

Golf clubs and courses in Bedfordshire
1912 establishments in England
Clapham, Bedfordshire